Gibellina (Sicilian: Jibbiddina, Arabic: "little mount" - جبل صغير) is a small city and comune in the Province of Trapani, the mountains of central Sicily, Italy. It was destroyed by the 1968 Belice earthquake.

One of them, the Italian sculptor Pietro Consagra created a sculpture called Porta del Belice or "Door to Belice" at the entrance. Consagra expressed a wish to be buried at Gibellina on his deathbed in July 2005.

The old town, the Ruderi di Gibellina (as the ruins of the city are referred to), remained just as it was after the earthquake, like a ghost town until 1985. In that year the Italian artist Alberto Burri began a project to cover the ruins in concrete, while preserving the streetscape. Known as Cretto di Burri, work on the project ceased in 1989, but it was completed in 2015.

References

Cities destroyed by earthquakes
Municipalities of the Province of Trapani
Destroyed cities